Uguccione Borromeo (died 1329) was a Roman Catholic prelate who served as Bishop of Novara (1304–1329).

Biography
On 19 February 1304, Uguccione Borromeo was appointed during the papacy of Pope Benedict XI as Bishop of Novara.
He served as Bishop of Novara until his death in 1329.

While bishop, he was the principal consecrator of Castone Torriani, Archbishop of Milan (1308).

References

External links and additional sources
 (for Chronology of Bishops) 
 (for Chronology of Bishops) 

14th-century Italian Roman Catholic bishops
Bishops appointed by Pope Benedict XI
1329 deaths